The Junior women's race at the 2006 IAAF World Cross Country Championships was held at the Umi-no-nakamichi Seaside Park in Fukuoka, Japan, on April 1, 2006.  Reports onf the event were given in The New York Times, and for the IAAF.

Complete results for individuals, for teams, medallists, and the results of British athletes who took part were published.

Race results

Junior women's race (6 km)

Individual

†: Yuliya Mochalova from  finished 24th in 21:03 min, but was disqualified because of doping violations.

Teams

Note: Athletes in parentheses did not score for the team result.

Participation
According to an unofficial count, 78 athletes from 25 countries participated in the Junior women's race.  This is in agreement with the official numbers as published.

 (5)
 (1)
 (5)
 (1)
 (6)
 (4)
 (5)
 (1)
 (1)
 (6)
 (1)
 (6)
 (1)
 (6)
 (1)
 (4)
 (1)
 (5)
 (1)
 (1)
 (2)
 (1)
 (6)
 (6)
 (1)

See also
 2006 IAAF World Cross Country Championships – Senior men's race
 2006 IAAF World Cross Country Championships – Men's short race
 2006 IAAF World Cross Country Championships – Junior men's race
 2006 IAAF World Cross Country Championships – Senior women's race
 2006 IAAF World Cross Country Championships – Women's short race

References

Junior women's race at the World Athletics Cross Country Championships
IAAF World Cross Country Championships
2006 in women's athletics
2006 in youth sport